Heinrich von Behr ( – 14 August 1983) was a Baltic German general during World War II.

Early life and education
In 1902 Heinrich von Behr was born into the Baltic German noble von Behr family, which owned Renda Manor. During the Latvian War of Independence, von Behr joined the Baltische Landeswehr in January 1919. 

After the properties of the von Behr family in Latvia were seized during the Latvian agrarian reform in 1920, von Behr moved to Weimar Germany, where in 1922 he joined the 16th Cavalry Regiment, 3rd Cavalry Division of the Reichswehr. In 1937 he became a teacher and pentathlon coach in the Wünsdorf Military Sports School (Heeressportschule Wünsdorf).

World War II
During WWII, von Behr led reconnaissance troops during action in Poland, France, the Eastern Front, North Africa and Italy. In December 1944 he was appointed commander of tank units on the Italian front, and in April 1945 as commander of the 90th Light Infantry Division. He was a recipient of the Knight's Cross of the Iron Cross with Oak Leaves of Nazi Germany.

Looting of French Artworks - Train 40044

On 1 August 1944, a few weeks before the Liberation of Paris on 25 August 1944, Rose Valland, a French art historian and member of the French Resistance, learned that von Behr was planning to remove to Germany as much artwork as he could, including many modern paintings. Valland learned that the trucks which had collected the artworks were heading to the Aubervilliers train station on the outskirts of Paris. By the 2 August 1944, 148 crates of paintings containing in total 967 paintings, including works by Braque, Cézanne, Degas, Dufy, Gauguin, Modigliani, Picasso, Toulouse-Lautrec and Utrillo had been loaded on five goods wagons waiting to be hooked up to another 48 goods wagons containing confiscated furniture and personal possessions of deported citizens. Fortunately, these other goods wagons had not yet been loaded which meant the train never left the station on schedule.

Valland was able to give a copy of the Nazi shipment order to Jaujard, which listed the train and goods wagon numbers, the contents of each crate and the destination of each goods wagon (either to Kogl Castle at Sankt Georgen im Attergau in Austria and the Nikolsburg depository in Moravia.) This information Jaujard passed on to the Resistance. By the 10 August, the train was ready to depart but by then the French railway workers were on strike. However, two days later the tracks were cleared and being delayed by higher priority trains carrying fleeing Germans and their personal possessions.  The train which had the designation 40044 departed hauling a total of 53 wagons.

The overloaded train reached Le Bourget before it suffered a mechanical breakdown. By the time the Germans had fixed the problem 48 hours later, the French Resistance had derailed two trains which blocked the tracks up ahead leaving the train stranded at Aulnay-sous-Bois.

Surrender 1945
Behr surrendered to the British troops in April 1945 and was held until August 1947. Afterwards, from September 1956, he served in the Bundeswehr of West Germany, commanding the 5th Armoured Division since December 1959. He retired in September 1962 at the rank of a general and died in Bonn in 1983.

Awards and decorations
 Iron Cross (1939) 2nd Class (20 April 1940) & 1st Class (24 June 1940)
 Knight's Cross of the Iron Cross with Oak Leaves
 Knight's Cross on 23 February 1944 as Oberst and commander of Panzer-Grenadier-Regiment 200
 689th Oak Leaves on 9 January 1945 as Oberst and commander of Panzer-Grenadier-Regiment 200
 Order of Merit of the Federal Republic of Germany (19 September 1962)

References

Citations

Bibliography

 
 

1902 births
1983 deaths
People from Kuldīga Municipality
People from Courland Governorate
Baltic nobility
Baltic-German people
Major generals of the German Army (Wehrmacht)
Bundeswehr generals
Major generals of the German Army
Recipients of the Knight's Cross of the Iron Cross with Oak Leaves
German prisoners of war in World War II held by the United Kingdom
Commanders Crosses of the Order of Merit of the Federal Republic of Germany